Bernard Charles Purdie (born 20 April 1949 in Wrexham, Wales) is a former professional footballer who played as a striker for his hometown club Wrexham before making the short journey across the border to join English neighbours Chester in 1971.

He made an explosive start to his Chester career by scoring four times on his full home debut against Gillingham but was to struggle for goals after this. At the end of 1972–73 he was released by Chester along with Graham Clapham and Mick Hollis.

Purdie remained in professional football by joining Chester's Cheshire rivals Crewe Alexandra, for the first of two spells with the club. In between he helped Huddersfield Town win the Football League Division Four championship in 1979–80 after a £22,000 transfer.

After finishing his league career with Crewe in 1983, Purdie joined non-league side Bangor City and worked as a postman in Wrexham but is now retired.

References

1949 births
Living people
Footballers from Wrexham
Welsh footballers
Association football forwards
Wrexham A.F.C. players
Chester City F.C. players
Crewe Alexandra F.C. players
Huddersfield Town A.F.C. players
English Football League players
Bangor City F.C. players